WLXN (1440 AM) is a radio station broadcasting a Southern gospel format. Licensed to Lexington, North Carolina, United States, it serves the Piedmont Triad area. The station is currently owned by Davidson County Broadcasting.  Its programming is also simulcast on translators, W260BG (99.9 FM) and W291DD (106.1 FM).

History
Originally, this station was called WBUY. In 1984, when co-owned WLXN-FM became WKOQ, the AM became WLXN and played Southern gospel and later soft adult contemporary music;  then WLXN changed to news/talk.

In 2010, several months after co-owned Majic 94.1 dropped oldies, that station's web site announced oldies were returning, on WLXN. The change took place on February 28, 2011.

On November 19, 2014, WLXN rebranded as "Majic 99.9". The station has also switched from Kool Gold to Tom Kent's 24/7 FUN. Max McGann and Ralph Shaw continued hosting the morning show until August 2015. The AM tower moved to the northern part of Davidson County, and the FM translator received a signal increase. In January 2016, Willie Edwards and Corie Odden took over the morning show. Following Odden's departure in mid-2016, Leanne Petty joined Edwards on Majic Mornings in October.

In 2020, WLXN switched to a simulcast of WWLV HD2's Air1. As of March 9, the local paper quoted Gig Hilton, owner and president of Davidson County Broadcasting, who said, "There is a planned format change coming to WLXN-AM in the near future. The date and time has not been defined, as there are certain contractual program obligations that must be fulfilled first. However there is no sale pending." 

WLXN's web site says that on August 5, 2022, Davidson County Broadcasting filed with the FCC for "consent of assignment of license to Positive Alternative Radio, Incorporated". The station's format has changed to Southern gospel.

Translators

Former logo

References

External links

LXN
LXN
Radio stations established in 1946
1946 establishments in North Carolina